Reinhart Boerner Van Deuren s.c. is a US-based law firm that was established in 1894. The firm offers legal services and business law advice to both publicly and privately held corporations, financial institutions, family-owned businesses, retirement plans, exempt organizations, and individuals.

Firm History 
In 1894, William Kaumheimer started his law practice in Milwaukee, United States. In 1919, he formed a partnership with Reginald Kenney, and they called the firm Kaumheimer & Kenney. Mr. Kaumheimer was the president of the Milwaukee Bar Association in 1919 and 1920. In 1925, his son, Leon E. Kaumheimer, joined him, and Mr. Kenney left the firm. The firm was then renamed Kaumheimer & Kaumheimer. After William Kaumheimer passed away in 1938, the firm of Kaumheimer, Alt & Likert was established. Until 1949, the firm did not have any new partners or associates. John Reinhart joined the firm in 1949, and Roger Boerner joined in 1954. Richard Van Deuren and Richard Norris arrived in 1956. In 1962, the firm changed its name to Kaumheimer, Reinhart, Boerner, Van Deuren & Norris.

In 1969, the firm incorporated as a service corporation and changed its name to Reinhart, Boerner, Van Deuren & Norris, s.c. In 1974, the firm added "Rieselbach" to its name. Reinhart expanded to Denver in 1985 with the firm's first female attorney and first female shareholder leading the office. In 1993, Reinhart opened an office in Madison. In 2002, Reinhart opened an office in Waukesha, WI, and in 2005, an office in Rockford, IL. Reinhart opened offices in Phoenix in 2011 and Chicago in 2012, bringing the total number of offices to seven.

Reinhart is an international service corporation that provides a broad range of legal services to businesses, individuals, nonprofit organizations, and other entities.

References 
Hoovers company profile.
Reinhart is ranked as a leading law firm by Chambers USA
Reinhart is ranked among the nation's 250 largest law firms by the National Law Journal.
Reinhart is ranked by U.S. News Media/Best Law Firms in several of its practice areas.
Benchmark Litigation 2013 has named Reinhart as a recommended law firm and Reinhart attorneys Mark Cameli, Scott Hansen and David Peterson as local litigation stars for Wisconsin.
Reinhart shareholder Gail Olsen was quoted in Business Journal-Milwaukee article on challenges small business owners face under Affordable Care Act.
Tracey Klein, co-chair of Reinhart's Health Care Practice, quoted in Business Journal-Milwaukee article on health exchange navigators
Reinhart Immigration chair Ben Kurten quoted in Business Journal-Milwaukee article on worker visa cap

Peter Blain's article in American Bankruptcy Institute Committee Newsletter
Goller and Barnes article in Wisconsin Institute of Certified Public Accountants' publication, "On Balance"
Peter Blain's article in Corporate LiveWire - Expert Guide to Bankruptcy and Restructuring
Robert Misey's article in Today's General Counsel
Keith Johnson's article in Rotman International Journal of Pension Management
Michael Goller's article in Journal of Tax Practice and Procedure

External links 
www.reinhartlaw.com Reinhart Boerner Van Deuren s.c.

Law firms based in Milwaukee
1894 establishments in Wisconsin